Khanimeh may refer to:
 Khanimeh-ye Bala
 Khanimeh-ye Pain